Bukit Jalil LRT station is an LRT station in Bukit Jalil, Kuala Lumpur, Malaysia.

It is operated under the Sri Petaling Line (formerly known as STAR LRT). This station is used by many sports fans due to its proximity to the KL Sports City (formerly known as National Sports Complex). This station opens at 6.00am and closes at 11.25pm daily, although during major events, its operating hours are extended.

Location
Bukit Jalil LRT station is located after the Sungai Besi LRT station and before the former terminus of Sri Petaling Line, the Sri Petaling LRT station.

The station is situated right at the heart of the KL Sports City, providing easy access to sports fans for the area. It is also the nearest station to Technology Park Malaysia, Malaysia's most advanced and comprehensive centre for research and development for knowledge-based industries.

History
The station was opened on July 11, 1998, as the phase 2 of the STAR LRT, a 15 km track with 11 stations that was built to serve the northern and southern areas of Kuala Lumpur. This station was built to cater for the Commonwealth Village and the National Sports Complex in Bukit Jalil, during the KL Commonwealth Games in 1998. At that time, Bukit Jalil station was named as "Sukan Negara" station, named after the previous name of the sport complex (where "Sukan Negara" means "National Sports" in Malay).

Design and layout

Bukit Jalil LRT station is an elevated station similar to most stations on the Sri Petaling and Ampang Lines, albeit with some differences. The station has two levels that are linked by stairways and escalators. The platform level for the station, located on the topmost floor, consisted of two sheltered side platforms along a double tracked line. The platforms themselves are considerably larger than other stations along the line. The lower level consists of a shared concourse containing the faregates, ticketing machines, and station control. There is a large entrance that leads directly towards the sports complex.

The station originally featured a similar design and ambience with other LRT stations, with roofs supported by latticed frames, and white plastered walls and pillars. It received a facelift in conjunction with the 2017 SEA Games and the renovation of the National Sports Complex as KL Sports City, being revamped with a sporting theme. The revamp features colourful and vibrant graphics, sports symbolisms, and inspirational quotes installed inside and outside the station, such as on the walls and staircases. The floor itself is painted to emulate a relay track, with the faregates acting as the end/beginning of the painted track.

Incidents and accidents
On September 24, 2008, two LRT trains collided about 200m from this station. A carriage of one of the trains involved in the accident hit the rear of the other train. Six passengers were injured in this accident.

In popular culture
The Bukit Jalil LRT station was used as a filming location for the 1999 film Entrapment starring Sean Connery and Catherine Zeta-Jones. In the film it was called Pudu station, which is actually another LRT station (though on the same line) in Kuala Lumpur.

See also

 List of rail transit stations in Klang Valley

References
 Trains collide on LRT line (updated)

External links

Ampang Line
Railway stations opened in 1998
1998 establishments in Malaysia